Niki Barr is an American musician from Denton, Maryland. Starting in 2013, she is the lead singer for The Last Year, a Baltimore, Maryland-based alternative band.

Career

Early years 
Niki began writing, performing, and recording at age 15 and soon after, began working with Mike Marucci of Marucci Artist Management, Inc.  He introduced Niki to producer, Jim Ebert.  Jim and Niki worked together on her records The Other Side of Me EP, Lush, and Go EP.  Lush (2005) was Niki's first full-length record and included songs co-written with Butch Walker, The Matrix (record production team), Wizardz of Oz, Matthew Gerrard, and Stephen Lironi. The single "Wasted Time" became the #1 single on Sky Radio in the UK for over 6 weeks. Soon after, Go was released as an EP, and it managed to sit atop Sky Radio for over 8 weeks in the UK.

Niki Barr Band 
Through her manager and friends, Niki joined forces with guitarist Island Styles, bassist Scott Von Ensign, and drummer BJ Kerwin to form Niki Barr Band.  Together, the band wrote, recorded, and produced their Bloom EP (2008). The band's follow up album, entitled "Radar Radio", was released in 2010.

In 2012, the band released a cover of the Nine Inch Nails song "Closer". The accompanying music video was the first ever created by the band. As of March 2020, the video has over 76,000 views on YouTube.

The Last Year 
In June 2013 Niki Barr and bandmate Scott Von Ensign formed "The Last Year". The duo was signed to a contract with Shanachie Entertainment, home to such artists as Rusted Root, Leela James, and the Flobots.  A five-song EP was released on August 13, 2013. The first single from the EP, "Sugar", was released in July 2013. The band made its public debut on July 12, 2013, at The Ottobar in Baltimore, Maryland.

In November 2013, The Last Year was named the 98 Rock Band of The Month by a local Baltimore radio station. and covered in Shockwave Magazine 

The band released a video featuring an acoustic version of their debut single "Sugar" on YouTube in February 2014. The video was reviewed by Guitar World, who described it as "...a haunting little number that showcases some great songwriting.". Later that year, the single was featured on the soundtrack of the first season of MTV's House of Food on episode 7, entitled "Sweet Relief".

The second single, "Mania", was released in February 2015 in advance of their next studio album. In support of the album, they toured throughout the year, including a performance at the 2015 South by Southwest Festival in Austin, Texas, where they were named one of the "Austin 100."
The band performed with Sick of Sarah during their 2015 tour.

"Mania" entered into Top 40 songs by Double Neuve FM 99 Peru on June 13, 2015. The song was ranked at number 20 on the Top Notch Top 25 Best Songs of 2015.

The band's next album, entitled Static Automatic, was released in March 2016. The band toured extensively in support of the album, including an appearance at Summerfest 2016 in Milwaukee, WI. They also performed at the National Park Service Centennial Celebration in Washington, D.C., on August 25, 2016.

On August 15, 2017, the band released the single, "Right Where You Want Me", on SoundCloud. It is the first track from the second full-length record, Timebombs, which was released on April 6, 2018.

Touring 
Niki Barr Band completed 12 international tours in 5 years with Armed Forces Entertainment (AFE), performing for                                                                                                                                                                                                                                                                                                                                                                                                                                                                                                                                                                                                                                                                                                                                                                                                                                                                                                                                                                                                                                                                                          US Troops in the Middle East, Japan, UK, and many other countries throughout Europe and Southeast Asia. The tours spanned 40 countries across 3 continents and brought the band support from Billboard Magazine, Rolling Stone Magazine, The Wall Street Journal, Time Magazine, and NPR Radio's "Border Crossings with Larry London."
April 30, 2009, Niki Barr Band won radio station DC101's "Last Band Standing" competition, granting them the opening spot of the DC101 Chili Cook-Off concert at RFK Stadium May 16, 2009, supporting bands Third Eye Blind, Papa Roach, and The Offspring.

The first AFE overseas tour went to Japan, Diego Garcia, and Singapore in 2003.  Niki's most extensive tour was in late 2005, which involved seven countries.  Countries she's performed in include Afghanistan, Bahrain, Djibouti, Saudi Arabia, Kuwait, Kyrgyzstan, Turkey, and United Arab Emirates.  In March–April 2007, the band returned to the same theater for another AFE sponsored tour.

Niki Barr Band was a headliner on the annual ShipRocked rock festival and music cruise, featured 2009 and invited to return 2010; the band appeared both years.

The band has shared stages with Joan Jett, Paramore, The Offspring, The Cult, Papa Roach, Shinedown, Puddle of Mudd, Third Eye Blind, The Red Jumpsuit Apparatus, Crossfade, Sevendust, Vince Neil, The GoGos, Tesla, Charm City Devils, and many other notable marquee acts.

Niki has also worked locally with United Service Organizations (USO) of Metropolitan Washington, D.C.

Clothing Line 
Niki created her own clothing line, Neurotica, in 2005.  Neurotica is a licensed and registered trademark of Niki Barr Enterprises, LLC.

Discography 
Timebombs ©2018
 Produced by The Last Year
 Right Where You Want Me
 Annabelle
 Bad Things
 Failing
 Drown With Me
 Promise
 Jealousy
 Through The Heart
 Dead
 The Beyond
 Timebombs
 Confidence
 Right Where You Want Me ©2017
Produced by The Last Year
Static Automatic ©2016
 Produced by The Last Year
 Mania
 Rush
 Dark Ages
 Silhouette
 Magic
 Chemical
 Static Automatic
The Last Year ©2013
 Produced by The Last Year
 Not The One
 Sugar
 Imagining
 Kill Me Now
 Flying
 Closer ©2012
Produced and Mixed by Niki Barr Band
Radar Radio ©2010
Produced and Mixed by Niki Barr Band with assistance from Bret Alexander at Obscura Sound
 Sex Friend
 Worry
 Ghosts
 Surrender
 Enemy
 Fallen
 Miles Away
 Lips Like Crucifix
 Enough
 Love Yourself
Bloom ©2008 EP
Produced and Mixed by Niki Barr Band at Obscura Sound
Mastered by Bruce Kane
 Undivided
 Alone
 So Cruel
 Burn
 Drowsy
Go ©2006 EP
Produced and Mixed by Jim Ebert
Co-writes with Ed Tuton and Butch Walker
 Go
 Cigarette Lighter Love Song
 Stick It
 If
 Wrong Way
Lush ©2005
 Produced and Mixed by Jim Ebert
Co-writes with Butch Walker and Bruce Brody
 Wasted Time
 Nothing At All
 Holiday
 Leave It Alone
 Used To Be
 Memories of Last Year
 Sooner Or Later
 So Far Away
 Getaway
 Such A Fool
 Inside Looking Out
 My Breathing Heart
The Other Side of Me ©2003 EP
 Produced by Jim Ebert
 Engineered by Rick Isaac
 All songs Mixed and Mastered by Jim Ebert
 Just Like You
 Today
 Bottom Row
 Run To Me
 Sugar Coated
 Until I See You Again
 Faulty
No Frills ©2001
 Acoustic album recorded in Niki's bedroom
 Sugar Coated
 One So Fine
 Intoxicated
 With You
 Speak
 Bottom Row
 Incognito
 Human Eye
 Second Time Around
 Give Enough

Niki Barr provides the vocals for the theme song for the crime re-enactment show "Scorned: Love Kills" on the Investigation Discovery channel.

References

Further reading 

Underground Music.FM – (2013-9-23) "Sugar" – The Last Year
 Where my girls at? (2013-9-13) "The Last Year – Interview with Niki Barr"
 
Oxley, Michelle, "Niki Barr Band heads to Easton with no complaints", The Beachcomber, July 2, 2009.
Zane Rettstatt, "Niki Barr: The 21st Century Joan Jett? Oh Yeah!", "The Bay Net Music", May 10, 2006

External links 

Official site of The Last Year
Official site of Niki Barr – Includes Press reviews.
US Navy Seals BLOG – Mentions Niki's 2008 Armed Forces Entertainment tour with stops in Italy, Spain, Portugal, the Netherlands
"Niki Barr: Your new rock princess?", RadioMojo.com, October 6, 2005 — Interview and review.
Von Stiers, Bruce, "Don't Leave Niki Alone", BVS Reviews.
Niki raises the Barr – November 2005 interview with Niki Barr

Year of birth missing (living people)
Living people
People from Denton, Maryland
Singers from Maryland
American women rock singers
21st-century American women